El Tuqui Airport,  is an airport serving Ovalle, a city in the Coquimbo Region of Chile.

There are dropoffs into the valley at each end and to the west of the runway.

Runway length does not include an additional  displaced threshold on Runway 22.

See also

Transport in Chile
List of airports in Chile

References

External links
El Tuqui Airport at OpenStreetMap
El Tuqui Airport at OurAirports

Airports in Coquimbo Region